The Komodo Armament D7CH is a bolt-action sniper rifle produced by PT Komodo Armament Indonesia. The rifle is configurable to adapt and receive a wide array of accessories that are needed by the operator. Ammunition used is 7.62x51 mm NATO ammunition. Like other Komodo Armament rifles, D7CH sniper rifle is manufactured using polymer material, with cerakote or hard anodize finish.

Users 

 : 100 units ordered in 2018.

See also 

 Pindad SPR
 Komodo Armament D7 PMR SA
 Remington MSR

References 

7.62×51mm NATO rifles
Sniper rifles of Indonesia
Post–Cold War military equipment of Indonesia
Bolt-action rifles